Shaesta Waiz (born 1987) is an American aviator. She is the first female certified civilian pilot born in Afghanistan, and in 2017, became the youngest woman to fly solo around the world in a single-engine aircraft - a record she held until Zara Rutherford completed the flight at the age of 19 in January, 2022.

Waiz was born in Afghanistan. Her family traveled to the United States in 1987 to escape the Soviet–Afghan War. She went on to study at Embry-Riddle Aeronautical University, where she started the Women's Ambassador Program to mentor and support young women pursuing an education in aviation and engineering.

She founded the non-profit organization Dreams Soar, Inc and planned a solo flight around the world, originally scheduled to launch in 2016. On October 4, 2017, Waiz completed the world solo trip across five continents, with 30 stops in 22 countries in a Beechcraft Bonanza A36.

Recognition
She is the subject of a children's book Fly, Girl, Fly! by Nancy Roe Pimm.

See also 

 Amelia Earhart
 Zara Rutherford

References 

1987 births
Living people
American women aviators
Afghan emigrants to the United States
Embry–Riddle Aeronautical University alumni
Women founders
Organization founders
21st-century American women